Édouard Wick was a French cyclist. He competed in the men's sprint event at the 1900 Summer Olympics. Wick raced for the Guidon Vélocipédique Parisien Club. In addition to his Olympic appearance, in 1900 he competed at both the World Sprint Championships, and the Grand Prix de Paris, but did not place in either event.

References

External links
 

Year of birth missing
Year of death missing
French male cyclists
Olympic cyclists of France
Cyclists at the 1900 Summer Olympics
Place of birth missing
Place of death missing